Yersinia alsatica is a Gram-negative bacterium in the family Yersiniaceae that has been isolated from human stool.

References

External links
LSPN lpsn.dsmz.de
Type strain of Yersinia alsatica at BacDive -  the Bacterial Diversity Metadatabase

alsatica
Bacteria described in 2020